The American Opera Company was the name of four different opera companies active in the United States. The first company was a short-lived opera company founded in New York City in February, 1886 that lasted only one season. The second company grew out of the Eastman School of Music in Rochester, New York, and was active from the mid-1920s up until 1930 when it went bankrupt not too long after the Wall Street Crash of 1929. The third opera company was a short lived company located in Trenton, New Jersey that was active in 1937. The fourth and last opera company was actively performing in Philadelphia from 1946 through 1950.

Jeannette Thurber's American Opera Company
The first American Opera Company was founded by patron of the arts Jeannette Meyers Thurber, who also established the National Conservatory of Music of America. It was incorporated in 1878 with an ambitious prospectus, which anticipated productions featuring "the largest regularly trained chorus ever employed in grand opera in America", "the largest ballet corps ever presented in grand opera in America", "four thousand new and correct costumes for which no expense has been spared in fabric or manufacture", and scenery "painted by the most eminent scenic artists in America". Although based in New York City, it was intended as a national company that toured throughout the United States, with the goal of increasing American appreciation for opera by offering productions in English, by American performers, at affordable ticket prices. A succinct statement of Thurber's vision for the company appeared in the New York Times in August 1886, which reported that in her view "the true conception of a national opera is opera sung in a nation's language and, as far as practicable, the work of a nation's composers".

The new company, which had Andrew Carnegie as its president and other New York millionaires among its board of directors, was under the musical direction of Theodore Thomas, with Gustav Hinrichs and Arthur Mees as assistant conductors, and Charles Locke as business manager. Its first season opened on January 6, 1886, with the first American performance of The Taming of the Shrew by Hermann Goetz, and 13 other productions followed, for a total of 126 individual performances. The repertoire included Verdi's Aida, Wagner's Lohengrin and The Flying Dutchman, and Gounod's Faust, all sung in English translation. Performances in New York took place in the Academy of Music and the old Metropolitan Opera House, and during the first season the company also performed on tour in Philadelphia, Washington D.C., and St. Louis. In August, they announced an ambitious plan to travel to Paris, a trip that never came about.

Although the productions were, by and large, a critical success, money quickly became a problem. Faced with a large operating deficit, Carnegie and other sponsors began to separate themselves from the project, and in order to escape its creditors the company was reorganized in December 1886 under a new name, the "National Opera Company". A second season followed, notable for the American premiere of Rubinstein's Nero on March 14, 1887, and for a national tour that took the company across the continent as far as San Francisco, dogged along the way by increasing financial difficulties. Singers and stage hands began to strike and sue for unpaid wages, and by the spring of 1887 the company was the subject of at least seven lawsuits. The director, Theodore Thomas, who later attributed the failure of the company to "inexperienced and misdirected enthusiasm in business management, and to misapplication of money", left on June 15, 1887, and after one final performance without him, Thurber's operatic experiment came to an end.

Rochester's American Opera Company

In the mid-1920s, a professional touring opera company emerged from the innovative productions of Vladimir Rosing and Rouben Mamoulian at the Eastman School of Music in Rochester. Its mission was to perform operas in English to popular audiences nationwide.
First known as the Rochester American Opera Company, the group made its New York City debut in April 1927 at the Guild Theatre.  It won the support of many wealthy and influential backers, including financier Otto Kahn, opera stars Mary Garden and Marcella Sembrich, and socialite Edith Rockefeller McCormick. By the time the company performed for President Coolidge and 150 members of Congress at Washington D.C.'s Poli's Theater in December 1927, the company was known as the American Opera Company.

The American Opera Company strictly adhered to a non-star policy, developing instead a unity of ensemble whereby a singer might have a leading role one night and a supporting role the next. A number of important singers emerged from the company, including future Metropolitan Opera stars John Gurney (bass-baritone), Helen Oelheim, Thelma Votipka, Charles Kullman, Nancy McCord and Gladys Swarthout. Future 1930s Broadway stars Natalie Hall and Bettina Hall were also among the principals, as was Hollywood's George Houston (actor). The company was known for the youth and attractiveness of its performers.

During January and February 1928 the American Opera Company brought seven weeks of opera to Broadway at New York's Gallo Opera House, including a notable adaptation of Faust with a new libretto by music critic for The New Yorker Robert A. Simon and sets by designer Robert Edmond Jones.

In addition to new English productions of familiar operas, the company subsequently premiered several works composed by American composers, including The Sunset Trail by Charles Wakefield Cadman, The Legend of the Piper by Eleanor Everest Freer, and Yolanda of Cyprus by Clarence Loomis.

Three ambitious North American tours were completed, with the opera company performing in 42 cities across the United States and Canada, but the Crash of 1929 caused bookings for the Fall 1930–31 season to disappear.

The American Opera Company won an official endorsement from President Herbert Hoover in February 1930 in a letter to the Speaker of the House, calling for it to become "a permanent national institution", but Presidential support was not enough as the country sank further into the Great Depression.

Among the company's last performances were a two week run at the famous Casino Theatre on Broadway just before the beloved New York theater's demolition in early 1930.

Trenton's American Opera Company
The American Opera Company in Trenton was founded in 1937 by conductor H. Maurice Jacquet. It presented two performances only that year before disbanding.

Philadelphia's American Opera Company
The American Opera Company in Philadelphia was founded in 1946 by conductor Vernon Hammond. It closed in 1950.

Notes and references

Culture of Manhattan
Culture of Philadelphia
Musical groups established in 1886
Musical groups disestablished in 1887
Musical groups disestablished in 1930
Musical groups established in 1937
Musical groups disestablished in 1937
Musical groups established in 1946
Musical groups disestablished in 1950
Musical groups from Philadelphia
New York (state) opera companies
Pennsylvania opera companies